Petrophila niphoplagalis is a moth in the family Crambidae. It was described by George Hampson in 1897. It is found in Dominica.

References

Petrophila
Moths described in 1897
Moths of the Caribbean